Daniel Amalm (born 16 February 1979) is an Australian actor and musician, best known for his role in serial Home and Away as foster kid Jack Wilson

Early life

Amalm was born in Brisbane, Queensland on 16 February 1979, his mother is Maltese and his father is Swedish. Amalm's father introduced him to guitar from an early age. Amalm's first performances were as a busker in Brisbane's Queen Street Mall with his brother where they were spotted by George Benson's tour manager and invited to Benson's sound check. The Amalm brothers jammed with George Benson and after the jam Benson donated his own money towards a new guitar that the brothers had been saving for. With that guitar Daniel Amalm won a scholarship to study guitar at the Queensland Conservatorium of Music. and was trained in classical guitar under Julian Byzantine. Amalm performed as one of the guitarists in "An Angel Moves Too Fast To See" written by Rhys Chatham for 100 electric guitars for the Brisbane Biennial on 4–5 June 1993. Amalm was runner up in the 9th Australian Classical Spanish Guitar Competition.

Career
Daniel's first television role of Jack Wilson in television soap opera Home and Away in 1994 and he was nominated for the Logie Award Most Popular New Talent in 1995.

In 1996, Amalm left Home and Away and recorded a single, 'Classical Gas', which was a top 21 hit on the ARIA Charts and No.5 on the Dance Charts; followed by 'Honey Dip Girl', which was voted No. 1 on Network Ten's Video Hits for 5 consecutive weeks. In 2000, he returned to Home and Away for a guest appearance and also appeared in TVserialk's All Saints and Tripping Over.

Daniel has worked as a music teacher in classical, flamenco and rock guitar. He has performed the live circuit with various Latin/Rock covers & originals bands and wrote with Alternative/Metal band OP25. Daniel's Brother Jacob plays drums in OP25. The band contributed to the original motion picture soundtrack of 'Two Fists One Heart' with a song called 'Like No Other'.

Daniel appeared in the Nine Network drama series Underbelly in 2008 as Melbourne underworld figure, Dino Dibra. He also starred in the Australian film Two Fists, One Heart which was released 19 March 2009 and Cedar Boys released July 2009. 

In 2009, Amalm began a regular role in drama series Rescue: Special Ops as Jordan Zwitkowski on the Nine Network and co-hosted FOX8's adaptation of the boxing reality series The Contender.

Daniel released an ambient classical guitar album in 2019 titled Guitared - Daniel Amalm  and a progressive flamenco album in 2020 titled Kaldera - Kaldera.

Television

 Pieces of Her
 Mr Inbetween
 Black Comedy
 Pulse
 Rescue: Special Ops
 Underbelly
 Tripping Over
 All Saints
 Whipping Boy
 Home and Away
 Cybergirl
 The Contender (TV series)
 Hey Hey It's Saturday  (episode 10 1996)

Film
Two Fists, One Heart
Cedar Boys

Discography

Albums

Singles

References

External links 

 
 Daniel Amalm on Spotify

1979 births
Australian male television actors
Australian male child actors
Living people
Australian people of Maltese descent
Australian people of Swedish descent
Australian dance musicians
Male actors from Brisbane
People educated at MacGregor State High School
Queensland Conservatorium Griffith University alumni